Sarmientoia is a genus of skippers in the family Hesperiidae, in which they are placed to tribe Phocidini.

Species
The following species are recognised in the genusSarmientoia:
Sarmientoia phaselis (Hewitson, 1867)
Sarmientoia faustinus (Burmeister, 1878)
Sarmientoia haywardi O. Mielke, 1967
Sarmientoia similis O. Mielke, 1967
Sarmientoia almeidai O. Mielke, 1967
Sarmientoia browni O. Mielke, 1967

References

Natural History Museum Lepidoptera genus database

Eudaminae
Hesperiidae genera